Amusium pleuronectes is a species of bivalves belonging to the family Pectinidae.

The species is found in Southeastern Asia and Australia. They are edible and sold at wet markets in Malaysia. In Hong Kong, the dried product is bought sold for cooking double-stewed soup.

References

Pectinidae
Taxa named by Carl Linnaeus
Bivalves described in 1758
Bivalves of Asia
Edible molluscs